Aleksei Sergeyevich Ivanushkin (born 20 November 1996) is a Russian football player.

He made his debut for the main squad of FC Kuban Krasnodar on 23 September 2015 in a Russian Cup game against FC Shinnik Yaroslavl.

References

External links
 

1996 births
Living people
Russian footballers
FC Kuban Krasnodar players
Association football defenders
FC Spartak Moscow players